The German-speaking Community of Belgium or Eastern Belgium is one of the three federal communities of Belgium. This page is an overview of its protected heritage sites, alphabetically ordered by town name.

Sources 

 Geschützte Objekte

 *Liege
Heritage sites